A bloomery is a type of furnace once used widely for smelting iron from its oxides.

Bloomery can refer to:

Bloomery, West Virginia (disambiguation)